The commune of Gishubi is a commune of Gitega Province in central Burundi. The capital lies at Gishubi.

References

Communes of Burundi
Gitega Province